The Milo President's Trophy is an annual school knockout u/20 rugby tournament in Sri Lanka. The tournament was first staged in 1985 when it was known as the Premadasa Trophy, named after Ranasinghe Premadasa (the then Prime Minister). The tournament involves the top seven school teams in the Division 1A Group and the winner of the Division 1B Group. In 2007 the tournament was expanded to include the Premier Trophy and in 2008 the Chairman's Trophy, to provide more school teams with the opportunity to compete at the same level.

In 2009 it was renamed as the Milo Trophy after two years it returned to its original name as the Milo President's Trophy.

In 2010 the scheduled final was suspended at the last minute by the authorities due to a court order issued by Isipathana College. The two teams, St. Peter's College and Royal College, however still played albeit as a friendly encounter, with St Peter's College winning 29–27. After two years, the court case was dismissed and the two schools were jointly awarded the Trophy.

In 2015 it was contested by only six sides, Royal College (2015 league champions), Isipathana College (league runner-up), Trinity College (third seed), Science College (fourth seed), St. Peter's College (fifth seed) and D. S. Senanayake College, after injuries decimated the league's sixth-placed finisher St. Joseph's College, league plate champions Wesley College and plate runner-up St. Anthony's. The President's Trophy was won by Science College for the first time, who defeated Isipathana College 21–18 in the final. Lalith Athulathmudali College won the Premier Trophy defeating Mahanama College 17–14 and in the Chairman's Trophy, St. Thomas' College, Matale, defeated Carey College, Colombo 7–0 in the final.

The competition in 2016 was essentially only contested by seven teams, with defending champions Science College withdrawing from the tournament due to financial issues, Trinity College deciding not to participate and the 2015 league plate champions St. Joseph's College pulling out due to injuries. D. S. Senanayake College who finished fourth in the league plate and twelfth in the league were scheduled to play due to Trinity College's withdrawal, however, they opted not to compete claiming that they have not had enough time to prepare for the tournament. The final was scheduled to be played on 9 July at the Royal Sports Complex but Isipathana lodged a protest insisting that Royal College would have a home ground advantage. The final was then rescheduled to be played at the Colombo Racecourse on 16 July however Isipathana objected as it would interfere with preparations for the national under-18s tour of Hong Kong. Both sides subsequently agreed to play the final on 13 July, where Isipathana College regained the President's Trophy by defeating Royal College 47–12. Thurstan College collected the Premier Trophy by successfully defeating St. John's College, Nugegoda 15–5, and St. Thomas' College, Matale won the Chairman's Trophy by beating Vidyaloka Maha Vidyalaya, Galle, 57 to nil.

In 2017 the tournament was contested amongst seven schools being Dharmaraja College, Wesley College, St. Joseph's College, Trinity College, St. Peter's College, Isipathana College and St. Anthony's College. The school's league champions, Royal College, pulling out of the event due to injury concerns. The quarterfinals were held at Sugathadasa Stadium between 9 and 11 June 2017. The semi-finals were held on 17 and 18 June at the Colombo Racecourse and the finals were on the 24 June at the same venue. Playing in their first-ever major rugby final St. Joseph's College clinched their maiden Milo President's Trophy by beating Isipathana College by 19–13. The Milo Premier's Trophy was held on 23 June 2017 at Sugathadasa Stadium, where Maliyadeva College defeated Ananda College 22–20. The final for the Chairman's Trophy was held earlier the same day, with St. Anne's College, Kurunegala beating Carey College, Colombo 15–12.

Past winners

Total wins
Isipathana College are the most successful schools rugby team having won the knockout tournament a total of ten times, including three wins whilst it was still the Prime Minister's Trophy (1985–95) and have been the runner up twelve times. St. Peter's College has won the trophy seven times (1995, 2006, 2007, 2008, 2010 where it was joint champions with Royal College, 2018 and 2019). S Thomas' College are the next most successful school having won the trophy five times (1989, 1990, 1991, 1994 and 2009). Kingswood College has won it four times in (2000, 2003, 2004 and 2005), with Royal College winning it three times (1988, 2002 and 2010 joint champions with St. Peter's College) along with Trinity College (1987, 1993 and 2011). Four teams have won it just once Thurstan College (1998), Wesley College (2013), Science College (2015) and St. Josephs' College (2017). Ananda College have been runners-up four times (1985, 1991, 1992 and 1999) but have yet to win the trophy.

 
 ‡ Shared

References

Rugby union competitions in Sri Lanka
Rugby union trophies and awards